Deni Elliott, D.Ed. is an ethicist and ethics scholar, and has been active in ethics scholarship and application since the 1980s. She holds the Eleanor Poynter Jamison Chair in Media Ethics and Press Policy, professor in the Department of Journalism and Digital Communication and is previous Department Chair at University of South Florida, St. Petersburg campus. Elliott is co-Chief Project Officer for the National Ethics Project. She also serves as the public member on the American Psychological Association Ethics Committee.

Early life and education
Deni Elliott was born Denise Nitkowski. She graduated from Parkdale High School, in Riverdale, MD in 1971, completed her B.A. in Mass Communication and Journalism at the University of Maryland in 1974, finished the M.A. in Philosophy in 1982 at Wayne State University and her D.Ed. in philosophy of education at Harvard University in 1984. Her doctoral examination committee members included Israel Scheffler, Sissela Bok, Lawrence Kohlberg, and Martin Linsky.

Career
While in graduate school, Elliott was appointed to the Harvard Educational Review from 1982-1983. Elliott was named one of the first two Rockefeller Fellows in Professional Ethics at Dartmouth College in 1987 and served as the first full-time director of Dartmouth's Institute for the Study of Applied and Professional Ethics (1988–1993). She is a founding member of the Association for Practical and Professional Ethics (APPE) and served on the Executive Board, successively re-elected from 1991 through 2017. She was elected Chair of the Board of Directors for APPE in March, 2013. Elliott served as Mansfield Professor of Ethics and Public Affairs at the University of Montana (1992–96) and founding director of UM's Practical Ethics Center (1996–2003). She was awarded the Poynter Jamison Chair in Media Ethics and Press Policy at the University of South Florida, St. Petersburg in 2003. Elliott served as the campus Ombuds for USF, St. Petersburg campus through 2017 and is currently the Interim Regional Vice Chancellor of Academic Affairs and Vice-Provost (RVCAA-VP) for the campus.

Elliott served as the book review editor for the Journal of Mass Media Ethics (1986–2006) and directed the first U.S. graduate degree program in teaching ethics at the University of Montana (1996–2003). In addition, Elliott served as the Ethics Officer for the Metropolitan Water District of Southern California from 2004-2012.

Elliott has published widely in practical ethics for the scholarly, trade and lay press. She also co-hosted a two-minute weekly radio show, Ethically Speaking, produced through KUFM radio and syndicated through PRX.

Elliott was appointed to the Graduate Council for Guiding Eyes for the Blind from 2013-2017 and chaired the nation's first Continuing Education Seminar for guide dog users in April 2017.

Books and documentary films

Responsible Journalism, Sage, 1986
and Bill Fisk (Co-producers), A Case of Need: Media Coverage and Organ Transplants, Fanlight Productions, 1990
Wendy Conquest, Bob Drake and Deni Elliott (co-producers) Buying Time: The Media Role in Health Care, Fanlight Productions, 1991
Wendy Conquest, Bob Drake and Deni Elliott (co-producers) The Burden of Knowledge: Moral Dilemmas in Prenatal Testing, Fanlight Productions, 1991
The Ethics of Asking: Dilemmas in Higher Education Fund Raising, Johns Hopkins University Press, 1995
and Judy Stern, Research Ethics: A Reader, University Press of New England, 1997
Judy Stern and Deni Elliott, The Ethics of Scientific Research: A Guidebook for Course Development, University Press of New England, 1997
Elliot D. Cohen and Deni Elliott, Contemporary Ethical Issues: Journalism, ABC-CLIO, 1998
The Kindness of Strangers: Philanthropy and Higher Education, Rowman & Littlefield, 2006
Ethics in the First Person: A Guide to Teaching and Learning Practical Ethics, Rowman & Littlefield, 2007
Ethical Challenges: Building an Ethics Toolkit, Authorhouse, 2009
Deni Elliott and Edward H. Spence. Ethics for a Digital Era, Wiley-Blackwell, 2017

References

External links

1953 births
Living people
American ethicists
21st-century American philosophers
American women philosophers
Philosophers from Florida
Harvard Graduate School of Education alumni
University System of Maryland alumni
Wayne State University alumni
University of Montana faculty
21st-century American women